The Pakistan cricket team are scheduled to tour the United Arab Emirates (UAE) in March 2023 to play three Twenty20 International (T20I) matches against the Afghanistan cricket team. In November 2022, the Afghanistan Cricket Board (ACB) signed a five-year agreement with the Emirates Cricket Board (ECB) to play their home matches in the UAE. On 7 March 2023, ACB confirmed the dates for the tour, with the matches scheduled to be played on 25, 27 and 29 March 2023. However, two days later, changes were made to the schedule due to the availability of the Hawk-Eye technology.

Background

Originally, Afghanistan were scheduled to play three One Day International (ODIs) matches each against Australia and Pakistan with the series being part of 2020–2023 ICC Cricket World Cup Super League. On 12 January 2023, Cricket Australia (CA) withdrew from ODI series against Afghanistan on the grounds of restrictions on women and girls' education and employment in Afghanistan. Australia forfeited the series and the 30 competition points were awarded to Afghanistan.

This series was originally scheduled to take place in 2021 but was postponed following the Taliban takeover of Afghanistan. On 23 January 2023, Both ACB and Pakistan Cricket Board (PCB) agreed to play three T20Is instead of ODIs as both were already qualified for the 2023 Cricket World Cup.

Squads

T20I series

1st T20I

2nd T20I

3rd T20I

References

External Links
 Series home at ESPN Cricinfo

International cricket competitions in 2022–23
2023 in Pakistani cricket
2023 in Afghan cricket